Raleigh Township may refer to the following townships:
 Raleigh Township, Ontario, Canada
 Raleigh Township, Saline County, Illinois, USA
 Raleigh Township, Wake County, North Carolina, USA